In database systems, atomicity (from ) is one of the ACID (Atomicity, Consistency, Isolation, Durability) transaction properties. An atomic transaction is an indivisible and irreducible series of database operations such that either all occurs, or nothing occurs. A guarantee of atomicity prevents updates to the database occurring only partially, which can cause greater problems than rejecting the whole series outright. As a consequence, the transaction cannot be observed to be in progress by another database client. At one moment in time, it has not yet happened, and at the next it has already occurred in whole (or nothing happened if the transaction was cancelled in progress).

An example of an atomic transaction is a monetary transfer from bank account A to account B. It consists of two operations, withdrawing the money from account A and saving it to account B. Performing these operations in an atomic transaction ensures that the database remains in a consistent state, that is, money is neither lost nor created if either of those two operations fails.

The same term is also used in the definition of First normal form in database systems, where it instead refers to the concept that the values for fields may not consist of multiple smaller value to be decomposed, such as a string into which multiple names, numbers, dates, or other types may be packed.

Orthogonality
Atomicity does not behave completely orthogonally with regard to the other ACID properties of transactions. For example, isolation relies on atomicity to roll back the enclosing transaction in the event of an isolation violation such as a deadlock; consistency also relies on atomicity to roll back the enclosing transaction in the event of a consistency violation by an illegal transaction.

As a result of this, a failure to detect a violation and roll back the enclosing transaction may cause an isolation or consistency failure.

Implementation
Typically, systems implement Atomicity by providing some mechanism to indicate which transactions have started and which finished; or by keeping a copy of the data before any changes occurred (read-copy-update).  Several filesystems have developed methods for avoiding the need to keep multiple copies of data, using journaling (see journaling file system). Databases usually implement this using some form of logging/journaling to track changes. The system synchronizes the logs (often the metadata) as necessary after changes have successfully taken place. Afterwards, crash recovery ignores incomplete entries. Although implementations vary depending on factors such as concurrency issues, the principle of atomicity – i.e. complete success or complete failure – remain.

Ultimately, any application-level implementation relies on operating-system functionality.  At the file-system level, POSIX-compliant systems provide system calls such as open(2) and flock(2) that allow applications to atomically open or lock a file. At the process level, POSIX Threads provide adequate synchronization primitives.

The hardware level requires atomic operations such as Test-and-set, Fetch-and-add, Compare-and-swap, or Load-Link/Store-Conditional, together with memory barriers. Portable operating systems cannot simply block interrupts to implement synchronization, since hardware that lacks concurrent execution such as hyper-threading or multi-processing is now extremely rare.

See also
 Atomic operation
 Transaction processing
 Long-running transaction
 Read-copy-update

References

Data management
Transaction processing